The Fiat Uno is a supermini manufactured and marketed by Fiat. Launched in 1983, the Uno was produced over a single generation (with an intermediate facelift, 1989) in three and five-door hatchback body styles until 1995 in Europe — and until 1 January 2014, in Brazil. Designed by Giorgetto Giugiaro of Italdesign, the Uno strongly recalled the high-roof, up-right packaging of Giugiaro's 1978 Lancia Megagamma concept, in a smaller configuration.

With over 8,800,000 built, it is the eighth most produced automobile platform in history, after the Volkswagen Beetle, Ford Model T, Fiat 124, 1965–1970 GM B platform, 1981–1997 GM J platform, 1961–1964 GM B platform, and 1977–1990 GM B platform.

The Uno name was reintroduced in 2010 in South America for the Fiat Mini (Economy) platform based car built in Brazil.

First generation (1983)

The Fiat Uno (Type 146) was launched in January 1983 to replace the Fiat 127. The tall, square body used a Kamm tail, achieved a drag coefficient of 0.34 and was noted for its interior space, fuel economy as well as its ride and handling. The project name was Tipo Uno ("Type 1"), as it followed the Tipo Zero (Panda).

Launched a month before the Peugeot 205, a noted competitor, the Uno went on sale just after General Motors launched its new Opel Corsa supermini (marketed as the Vauxhall Nova in the UK), quickly gaining competition from the Ford Fiesta and Nissan Micra.

United Kingdom sales began in June 1983, with more than 20,000 sold in its first full year and peaking at more than 40,000 sales in 1988.

In December 1983, the Uno was European Car of the Year for 1984, finishing narrowly ahead of the Peugeot 205.

Initially, the Uno was offered with the 0.9 litre (903 cc) 100-series OHV, 1.1 litre (1116 cc) and 1.3 litre (1301 cc) 128-series SOHC petrol engines and transmissions carried over from the 127. Typical for Fiats of the era, the Uno's badging did not reflect engine size but indicated metric horsepower output: 45, 55, 60, 70, or 75. The Uno was available as either a three- or five-door hatchback. It also featured ergonomic switchgear clusters each side of the main instrument binnacle, user-operable with hands on the steering wheel, with only a single steering column stalk to control the turn signals and horn - thus dispensing from Fiat's traditional three-stalk system that had been employed on its cars since the late 1960s.

The Uno had MacPherson strut independent front suspension and twist-beam rear suspension with telescopic dampers and coil springs.

From 1985, the 1.0 litre (999 cc) SOHC Fully Integrated Robotised Engine (FIRE) powerplant was offered, replacing the 0.9 litre unit. This was a lighter engine, built with fewer parts, and gave improved performance and economy. The most luxurious version, the single-point injected 75 SX i.e., had remote door locks, integrated front foglamps, and the oval exhaust tip also used on the Turbo.

Turbo i.e.

In April 1985 the hot hatch version of the first series Uno – the Uno Turbo i.e. – was launched as a three-door only derivative. The Turbo i.e. model used a Ritmo/Strada-derived 1.3 128-series engine with Bosch multi-point fuel injection, Magneti Marelli electronic ignition and a water-cooled IHI turbocharger with an intercooler to reduce intake air temperatures. Engine capacity was initially stated as 1299 cc but this was revised early on in production to 1301 cc. This change was a result of Italy's highway system allowing a higher speed limit to cars of more than 1300 cc. In both forms the engine offered  but owners report that the 1301 cc version was notably more responsive and had greater torque than the earlier 1299 cc unit. Cars built from 1985 to late 1987 were fitted with a Ritmo/Strada-derived five-speed gearbox.  This was then replaced by a newly developed 'C510' five-speed gearbox, featuring a more durable differential and improved gearchange linkage. Ratios were unchanged between the two units. The Turbo reached .

Externally, the Turbo i.e. model featured black plastic sill trims, arch extensions, fibreglass tailgate with spoiler, tinted side glass, side decals, revised front bumper with foglamps and inlets/scoops to direct air to the oil cooler and intercooler.  Suspension was lowered and uprated, 13" alloy wheels with Pirelli P6 tyres were fitted and the brakes upgraded to vented discs on the front and solid discs on the rear.

The Turbo i.e. featured 'sports' seats, red carpet and an extended centre-console. Later models featured red seatbelts.

Options on the Turbo i.e. model included polished Cromodora wheels, electric windows, manual sunroof and digital instrument panel, the latter with bar-graphs for fuel level, coolant temperature, boost pressure, etc., and a digital speed display, switchable between km/h and mph.

An option on later first series Turbo i.e. models included a simple form of ABS that only operated on the front wheels.  The system operated once per ignition cycle, requiring an ignition-initiated reset, had the system been triggered.

Diesel and Selecta models
In mid-1983 the 1.3-litre diesel which had already been seen in the Fiorino and the 147 was installed in the Uno as well, originally only for the Italian market. The Brazilian-built engine was derived from 124-series engines, and was never sold in the United Kingdom. It was added to other European markets beginning in early 1984. Daily production in mid-1983 was 280 cars, out of a daily total of 2000. It was sold as the Uno D (three doors) or the Uno DS ("Super", five doors). This badging was the only external giveaway, while in the interior an oil pressure gauge was added. It also received extra sound insulation under the hood and along the firewall. The engine has , as did the smallest 903 cc petrol unit, but with considerably higher torque. Additional accessories and sound deadening measures accounted for the remainder of the  weight difference, almost all of it over the front wheels.

In 1986, a 1.7 litre diesel engined 60DS version was launched together with the Uno Selecta continuously variable transmission (CVT) automatic. The 1.7L naturally aspirated diesel was the only diesel Uno sold in the UK. The CVT transmission was a co-development with Dutch Van Doorne and Ford, (Fiat owned 24% stake of Van Doorne at that time). There was also a 1.4-liter turbodiesel (Uno Turbo D), which offered . This model was very quick for a small diesel at the time, and had better acceleration than the petrol-engined Uno 70, while fuel consumption was about a third lower. Noise levels were actually marginally lower than those of the 70 SX. The suspension was firmer to accommodate the heavier engine, while an oil temperature gauge was standard fitment.

Uno CS
The Uno was also produced in Brazil, called Uno CS, and imported in some European countries. But it was a totally different car: it was riding on a Fiat 147-derived platform, with four-wheel MacPherson suspension (with transverse leaf spring at the rear). Visual differences from the European Uno were the fuel cap, placed on the left, and the bonnet, of a clamshell design and hinged at the front. It had also had its own engines, part of the "Brazil" engine series.

Yugo Uno 45R
From 1988 to 1994, first series Uno was assembled in Kragujevac, Yugoslavia by Zastava. It was fitted with a 903 cc  engine also used in the Yugo 45. Only the three-door version was available. Due to a higher price than the Yugo, the Uno 45R was discontinued in 1994, after 2,620 examples had been produced.

Facelift 
First shown at the Frankfurt Motor Show in September 1989, the Uno received a facelift with revised front styling and revised tailgate, the latter improving the drag coefficient to Cd 0.30,. The interior was revised with a new dashboard which dispensed with the pod-style switchgear in favour of conventional stalks on the steering column. The 1.1 litre engine was replaced by a FIRE version, and a Fiat Tipo-derived 1.4 litre (1,372 cc) engine replaced the 128/Ritmo/Strada-derived 1.3 litre in both naturally aspirated and turbo versions. A 1.4 litre Uno Turbo could reach a claimed , while the 1.0 version only managed  depending on which transmission was fitted. The Uno Turbo i.e. variant was also restyled, upgraded with a Garret T2 turbine, Bosch LH Jetronic fuel injection and better aerodynamics.

Uno production ended in Italy in 1995 with 6,032,911 manufactured in Fiat's Italian factories. From 1994 to 2002, Uno was manufactured in Poland for Fiat Auto Poland. Polish-made Unos were marketed in Italy until 1997 as the Innocenti Mille Clip.  Polish production initially took place in Bielsko-Biała, and from 2000 to 2002 in Tychy. Engines available were three petrol units (all naturally aspirated and fuel injected) – 0.9 litre from Seicento (years 1999–2002 only), 1.0 fire, 1.4 and one naturally aspirated diesel unit of 1.7 litres.

Engines (first and second series)

Petrol

Diesel

Continuing global production (1995–2014) 

After Western European production and sales ceased, the Uno continued to be manufactured and sold in many other regions.

Argentina 
In Argentina, the 3-door Fiat Uno was produced by Sevel Argentina S.A. from March 1989 to 2000, 179,767 units were built. The Uno's Fiasa engines ranged from the 1,049 cc  petrol four to a 1.3 and 1.5 litre version, with a 1.3-litre  diesel engine also available. The 1.6-litre Lampredi SOHC  SCV/SCR version sat at the top of the range.

A specific saloon version with four doors was also produced from 1988 to 2001. Called Duna or Elba, 257,259 units of this version were built in Fiat's Córdoba plant.

Brazil 
The car was made in Brazil until January 2014 in three versions: Mille Economy, Uno Furgão (panel van) and Fiorino Furgão . A total of 3.6 million Unos and Milles were built in Brazil during its 30-year production run. During the 1990s it was imported in Italy as "Innocenti Mille".

In the second half of the 1980s and the first half of the 1990s, the Uno was also available as a saloon, a pick-up, and in a wagon version. These are called Prêmio, Fiorino Pick-Up, and Elba respectively.

The Brazilian Uno featured an independent, transverse leaf spring suspension at the rear, based on the tried and tested Brazilian Fiat 147 (similar to the 
Italian Fiat 127). The clamshell design of the bonnet was also unique, since the Brazilian Uno kept the spare tyre located in the engine bay, like the old Fiat 147, thus saving extra space for the luggage in the boot. Originally sold with 1.05, 1.3 or 1.5 litre petrol engines (also in versions made to run on ethanol), and a 1.6 litre was added to the lineup in 1989. The now redundant 1.5 was cancelled, but another 1.5 was introduced in 1991, this one derived from the 1.3.

The Brazilian Fiat Uno family was topped by a sporting turbocharged 1.4-litre inline-four version (118 HP), the Uno Turbo i.e. This model was available between 1994 and 1996 and was part of the regularly available lineup; 1801 units were produced. 

From 1990 to 2014, a 1.0 litre version was sold as the Fiat Mille, as a budget entry-level model, and received its most recent facelift for the 2004 model year. A Fire engine was used since 2001. The 2005 Brazilian range has received a Flex Fuel system, enabling the car to use ethanol or gasoline as fuel, both pure or in any proportion mixture; also, there is a version fitted for unpaved roads called Mille Way, which includes higher and a more resilient suspension, larger wheels and side cladding.
44
Despite the launch of the new Brazilian-built Uno in 2010, production of the Mille Economy and Mille Way continued until January 2014
3, only with a 1.0 litre engine. The Uno Furgão van was a light commercial version of the three-door Uno hatchback with blinded rear windows and no rear seat. It and the Fiorino Furgão were available with a 1.25 litre Fire engine.

Engines 
Petrol

India 
After an abortive launch in 1996 when its CKD joint partner PAL delivered only 617 cars of the 30,000 ordered,
Fiat started its venture as a 50-50 Industrial Joint Venture between Fiat Group Automobiles S.p.A. (Fiat) and Tata Motors Limited in January 1997. At present the company employs about 600 employees in its Ranjangaon facility in the Pune District of Maharashtra.  The Uno was initially a success in India, but then it faded badly due to poor dealer support.

Morocco 
The Fiat Uno was also assembled in Morocco until 2003 by SOMACA (Société Marocaine des Constructions Automobiles), and remains a popular choice of car for "petit-taxi" use.

Turkey 
The Uno was first assembled in Turkey in 1994 and the production ran until 2000. Only the five-door bodystyle was assembled in Turkey. The engine options were 1.4, and 1.4 i.e. The fully equipped version was named Uno Hobby; it offered power steering and AC. It also differed from regular Unos in being available only in one colour option, sky blue with silver bumpers.

South Africa 
In South Africa, the Uno was assembled under licence by Nissan from 1990 until 1998 and then by Fiat from 1998 up until 2006. Unos manufactured by Nissan had the word "licence" underneath the Fiat badge on the rear end and models included the 1,108 cc FIRE,1,372 cc PACER, PACER SX and 1,372 cc TURBO. Later on there were also a number of special editions produced which included the Beat (1,372 cc), the Rio (1,108 cc) and for a short period the Cento (999 cc). After Fiat re-entered the South African market in 1998 Unos were rebadged as either the (1,108 cc) Mia or (1,372 cc) Tempo. They also featured the Fiat centenary badge from that point on. By the time initial production of the Uno ended in 2006 only the (1,108 cc) Mia was available for sale. 110,000 units were produced between 1990 and 2002.

In 2007, the Fiat Uno was redesigned and it re-entered the South African new car market. The car was now marketed and distributed by Fiat themselves. The model line-up includes the Uno Way, which has a higher suspension than the regular Uno and colour-coded bumpers. It is based on the 1983–1990 design, and is powered by a 1.2 litre 4-cylinder petrol engine.

Philippines 
Local manufacturer Francisco Motors, primarily known as a manufacturer of the Jeepney, partnered with Fiat to create a joint venture called Italcar Pilipinas Inc. in 1990. They assembled the Fiat Uno from 1992–2000 under the People's Car Program, which was an incentive by the government of President Corazon Aquino to stimulate car production in the Philippines. The joint venture hoped to compete with the Toyota Corolla and Nissan Sentra with the Uno in the taxicab market, which accounted for many sales. The Uno was not popular and production decreased yearly until the venture was terminated in 2000.

Poland 
Production in Fiat's factory in Poland ran until 2002. 173,382 units were built from June 1995 to October 2002. It was imported in Italy as Innocenti Mille Clip.

Pakistan 
The Fiat Uno is also assembled from complete knock down (CKD) kits in Pakistan by Raja Motor Company. Production started in 2001 and continued until 2004 when the manufacturing plant had to be closed down. Only the diesel variant of the car was made available under the 1.7D model. Although large scale manufacturing of the car has ceased, stocks of CKD are still being assembled and sold at present.

Sales performance

United Kingdom 
Around 300,000 examples of the Uno were sold in Britain between 1983 and 1995, with the MK1 proving more popular than the MK2. It was one of the most popular imported cars in Britain during the 1980s, peaking at more than 40,000 sales in 1988. However, by March 2019 there were just 232 examples of either generation still in use.

Second generation (2010)

The Fiat Uno name was resurrected for project Type 327, the Brazilian-built "Novo Uno" (New Uno). The new Uno is engineered at Brazil and co-designed with Turin's Centro Stile Fiat, and is basically a more urban interpretation of the Fiat Panda style on a Fiat Palio. It is larger and roomier than the first, but smaller and cheaper than the second platform. The car has two options of engines: the 1.0 Fire Evo (74 hp) and the 1.4 Fire Evo (87 hp), both able to use ethanol, gasoline or a mix of both fuels.

It is being sold in Brazil and several other South American countries as well, but it has yet to be confirmed whether this Uno will be sold in Europe.

In December 2013, Fiat launched the new Uno-based Fiorino panel van (project Type 327), successor of the old Fiorino.

In September 2014, Fiat unveiled a facelift for the Uno and introduced the Start&Stop system in the 1.4 Fire engine.

In 2016, Fiat launched another facelift for the Uno and introduced the Firefly engine, Available as a 1.0 or an 1.3 engine.

In 2018, Fiat removed the Way and Sporting trims and their versions with the GSR semi-automatic transmission, and added a new "Drive" version to be the new base model and only kept that and the "Attractive" version only with the 1.0 Firefly engine and in mid-2018 the Way version was brought back in with both 1.0 and 1.3 engines

In 2021 the model was no longer offered with the Firefly engine, it returned to the old 1.0 73/75 PS Fire Evo, only in the Attractive version. The Way, Sporting and Drive versions were discontinued. The model production ended at the end of this year with the Fiat Uno Ciao limited edition (250 units).

Safety 
A Brazilian Fiat Uno was tested by Latin NCAP in 2011 and has been rated as highly unsafe, scoring only one star for adult occupants and two stars for children. Another test made in 2013 rated zero stars.

Fiat Uno Cabrio (Concept)

At the São Paulo International Motor Show in October 2010 the Uno Cabrio concept car was presented; the prototype has two seats and a body kit. The engine is the 1.4 Fire T-Jet 16V that produced 152 HP.

Notes

References

External links

Uno
Italdesign vehicles
Subcompact cars
Hatchbacks
Vehicles with CVT transmission
Front-wheel-drive vehicles
1980s cars
1990s cars
2000s cars
2010s cars
Cars introduced in 1983
Cars of Turkey
Rally cars
Cars of India
Cars of Brazil
Cars of Argentina
Latin NCAP superminis
Cars discontinued in 2021